Henry Crawford is a character in Jane Austen's novel, Mansfield Park.

Henry Crawford may also refer to:

Henry Clay Crawford (1856–1929), American politician
Homewood Crawford (Sir Henry Homewood Crawford, 1850–1936), English solicitor
Shag Crawford (Henry Crawford, 1916–2007), American baseball umpire
Henry O. Crawford (1901–1967), American football and track and field coach

See also
Harry Crawford (disambiguation)